Roald Hoffmann (born Roald Safran; July 18, 1937) is a Polish-American theoretical chemist who won the 1981 Nobel Prize in Chemistry. He has also published plays and poetry. He is the Frank H. T. Rhodes Professor of Humane Letters, Emeritus, at Cornell University, in Ithaca, New York.

Early life

Escape from the Holocaust

Hoffmann was born in Złoczów, Second Polish Republic (now Zolochiv, Ukraine), to a Polish-Jewish family, and was named in honor of the Norwegian explorer Roald Amundsen. His parents were Clara (Rosen), a teacher, and Hillel Safran, a civil engineer. After Germany invaded Poland and occupied the town, his family was placed in a labor camp where his father, who was familiar with much of the local infrastructure, was a valued prisoner. As the situation grew more dangerous, with prisoners being transferred to extermination camps, the family bribed guards to allow an escape. They arranged with a Ukrainian neighbor named Mykola Dyuk for Hoffmann, his mother, two uncles and an aunt to hide in the attic and a storeroom of the local schoolhouse, where they remained for eighteen months, from January 1943 to June 1944, while Hoffmann was aged 5 to 7.

His father remained at the labor camp, but was able to occasionally visit, until he was tortured and killed by the Germans for his involvement in a plot to arm the camp prisoners. When she received the news, his mother attempted to contain her sorrow by writing down her feelings in a notebook her husband had been using to take notes on a relativity textbook he had been reading. While in hiding his mother kept Hoffmann entertained by teaching him to read and having him memorize geography from textbooks stored in the attic, then quizzing him on it. He referred to the experience as having been enveloped in a cocoon of love. In 1944 they moved to Krakow where his mother remarried. They adopted her new husband's surname Hoffmann.

Most of the rest of the family was killed in the Holocaust, though one grandmother and a few others survived. They migrated to the United States on the troop carrier Ernie Pyle in 1949.

Hoffmann visited Zolochiv with his adult son (by then a parent of a five-year-old) in 2006 and found that the attic where he had hidden was still intact, but the storeroom had been incorporated, ironically enough, into a chemistry classroom. In 2009, a monument to Holocaust victims was built in Zolochiv on Hoffmann's initiative.

Personal life
Hoffmann married Eva Börjesson in 1960. They have two children, Hillel Jan and Ingrid Helena.

He is an atheist.

Education and academic credentials
Hoffmann graduated in 1955 from New York City's Stuyvesant High School, where he won a Westinghouse science scholarship. He received his Bachelor of Arts degree at Columbia University (Columbia College) in 1958. He earned his Master of Arts degree in 1960 from Harvard University. He earned his doctor of philosophy degree from Harvard University while working under joint supervision of Martin Gouterman and subsequent 1976 Nobel Prize in Chemistry winner William N. Lipscomb, Jr. Hoffman worked on the molecular orbital theory of polyhedral molecules. Under Lipscomb's direction the Extended Hückel method was developed by Lawrence Lohr and by Roald Hoffmann. This method was later extended by Hoffmann. He went to Cornell in 1965 and has remained there, becoming professor emeritus.

Scientific research

Hoffmann's research and interests have been in the electronic structure of stable and unstable molecules, and in the study of transition states in reactions. He has investigated the structure and reactivity of both organic and inorganic molecules, and examined problems in organo-metallic and solid-state chemistry. Hoffman has developed semiempirical and nonempirical computational tools and methods such as the extended Hückel method which he proposed in 1963 for determining molecular orbitals.

With Robert Burns Woodward he developed the Woodward–Hoffmann rules for elucidating reaction mechanisms and their stereochemistry. They realized that chemical transformations could be approximately predicted from subtle symmetries and asymmetries in the electron orbitals of complex molecules. Their rules predict differing outcomes, such as the types of products that will be formed when two compounds are activated by heat compared with those produced under activation by light. For this work Hoffmann received the 1981 Nobel Prize in chemistry, sharing it with Japanese chemist Kenichi Fukui, who had independently resolved similar issues. (Woodward was not included in the prize, which is given only to living persons, although he had won the 1965 prize for other work.) In his Nobel Lecture, Hoffmann introduced the isolobal analogy for predicting the bonding properties of organometallic compounds.

Some of Hoffman's most recent work, with Neil Ashcroft and Vanessa Labet, examines bonding in matter under extreme high pressure.

Artistic interests

The World Of Chemistry with Roald Hoffmann
In 1988 Hoffmann became the series host in a 26-program PBS education series by Annenberg/CPB, The World of Chemistry, opposite with series demonstrator Don Showalter. While Hoffmann introduced a series of concepts and ideas, Showalter provided a series of demonstrations and other visual representations to help students and viewers to better understand the information.

Entertaining Science 
Since the spring of 2001, Hoffmann has been the host of the monthly series Entertaining Science at New York City's Cornelia Street Cafe, which explores the juncture between the arts and science.

Non-fiction
He has published books on the connections between art and science: Roald Hoffmann on the Philosophy, Art, and Science of Chemistry and Beyond the Finite: The Sublime in Art and Science.

Poetry
Hoffmann is also a writer of poetry. His collections include The Metamict State (1987), Gaps and Verges (1990), and Chemistry Imagined, co-produced with artist Vivian Torrence.

Plays
He co-authored with Carl Djerassi the play Oxygen, about the discovery of oxygen and the experience of being a scientist. Hoffman's play, "Should've" (2006) about ethics in science and art, has been produced in workshops, as has a play based on his experiences in the holocaust, "We Have Something That Belongs to You" (2009), later retitled "Something That Belongs to You.

Honors and awards

Nobel Prize in Chemistry
In 1981, Hoffmann received the Nobel Prize in Chemistry, which he shared with Kenichi Fukui "for their theories, developed independently, concerning the course of chemical reactions".

Other awards
Hoffmann has won many other awards, and is the recipient of more than 25 honorary degrees.

ACS Award in Pure Chemistry, 1969 
 Award of the International Academy of Quantum Molecular Science, 1970, "pour sa methode de calcul des fonctions d'onde moleculaires et pour ses etudes theoriques des reactions chimiques"
Fellow of the American Academy of Arts and Sciences, elected 1971
Elected member of the National Academy of Sciences, elected 1972
Arthur C. Cope Award in Organic Chemistry, 1973 (with Robert B. Woodward)
 Nobel Prize in Chemistry, 1981
Inorganic Chemistry Award (American Chemical Society), 1982 (sponsored by Monsanto)
National Medal of Science, 1983
Fellow of the American Philosophical Society, elected 1984
 Elected a Foreign Member of the Royal Society (ForMemRS) in 1984
Foreign Member of the Royal Swedish Academy of Sciences, elected 1985
Priestley Medal, 1990
Harvard Centennial Medalist, 1994
Pimentel Award in Chemical Education, 1996
E.A. Wood Science Writing Award, 1997
Literaturpreis of the Verband der Chemischen Industrie for his textbook The Same and Not The Same, 1997
Kolos Medal, 1998
American Institute of Chemists Gold Medal, 2006
James T. Grady-James H. Stack Award for Interpreting Chemistry, 2009
Fellow of the American Chemical Society, 2009
Fellow of the Kosciuszko Foundation of Eminent Scientists of Polish Origin and Ancestry, 2014
 Ullyot Public Affairs Lecture, Science History Institute, 2019
Marie Curie Medal

Hoffmann is a member of the International Academy of Quantum Molecular Science and the Board of Sponsors of The Bulletin of the Atomic Scientists.

In August 2007, the American Chemical Society held a symposium at its biannual national meeting to honor Hoffmann's 70th birthday.

In 2008, the Göttingen Academy of Sciences and Humanities awarded him its Lichtenberg Medal.

In August 2017, another symposium was held at the 254th American Chemical Society National Meeting in Washington DC, to honor Hoffmann's 80th birthday.

The Hoffmann Institute of Advanced Materials in Shenzhen, named after him, was founded in his honor in February 2018 and formally opened in his presence in May 2019.

References

External links 
 

1937 births
Living people
Nobel laureates in Chemistry
American Nobel laureates
21st-century American chemists
Jewish American atheists
Polish emigrants to the United States
Brentwood High School (Brentwood, New York) alumni
Columbia College (New York) alumni
Cornell University faculty
Harvard University alumni
Jewish American scientists
Jewish chemists
Jews from Galicia (Eastern Europe)
Eli Lilly and Company people
Foreign Members of the Royal Society
Members of the International Academy of Quantum Molecular Science
Members of the Royal Swedish Academy of Sciences
Members of the United States National Academy of Sciences
Foreign Members of the Russian Academy of Sciences
Foreign Fellows of the Indian National Science Academy
National Medal of Science laureates
Recipients of the Lomonosov Gold Medal
People from Zolochiv, Lviv Oblast
Polish Nobel laureates
Polish chemists
Stuyvesant High School alumni
Survivors of World War II deportations to Transnistria
Fellows of the American Chemical Society
Theoretical chemists
Computational chemists
Stereochemists
Sloan Research Fellows
Scientists from New York (state)
Fellows of the American Physical Society